Dipchasphecia is a genus of moths in the family Sesiidae.

Species
Dipchasphecia altaica Gorbunov, 1991
Dipchasphecia consobrina (Le Cerf, 1938)
Dipchasphecia intermedia Špatenka, 1997
Dipchasphecia iskander Gorbunov, 1994
Dipchasphecia kashgarensis Špatenka & Kallies, 2001
Dipchasphecia kopica Gorbunov & Špatenka, 2001
Dipchasphecia krocha Gorbunov, 1991
Dipchasphecia kurdaica Špatenka, Petersen & Kallies, 1997
Dipchasphecia lanipes (Lederer, 1863)
Dipchasphecia ljusiae Gorbunov, 1991
Dipchasphecia naumanni Gorbunov, 1991
Dipchasphecia nigra Gorbunov, 1991
Dipchasphecia pudorina (Staudinger, 1881)
Dipchasphecia rhodocnemis Gorbunov, 1991
Dipchasphecia roseiventris (Bartel, 1912)
Dipchasphecia sertavula Bartsch & Špatenka, 2002
Dipchasphecia turkmena Gorbunov, 1994

References

Sesiidae